24th (County of London) Battalion (The Queen's) was a battalion of the London Regiment (1908-1938). Between 1908 and 1938 it was based at the Braganza Street drill hall, though in 1914 it mobilised for war at 71 New Street, Kennington Park Road.

Its origins lay in the 19th Surrey Rifle Volunteers, founded in 1859. That unit became the 8th Surrey Rifle Volunteer Corps in 1880, which three years later was assigned to the Queen's Royal Regiment (West Surrey) as the latter's 4th (Volunteer) Battalion. When the Territorial Force was formed in 1908, the battalion was reassigned to the new London Regiment, with whom it remained until 1938, when it returned to the Queen's Royal Regiment (West Surrey), now as that regiment's 7th (Southwark) Battalion. Its World War One memorial was unveiled at the entrance to Kennington Park in 1924, with its World War Two dead later added.

After the Second World War the battalion converted to artillery and, in 1947, became the 622nd Heavy Anti-Aircraft Regiment, Royal Artillery.

References 

24th
Military units and formations in London
Military units and formations in Lambeth
Military units and formations in Southwark
Military units and formations established in 1908
Military units and formations disestablished in 1938